Saygı is a Turkish surname. Notable people with the surname include:

 Fikret Mualla Saygı (1903–1967), Turkish painter
 Sıla Saygı (born 1996), Turkish figure skater

See also 
 Saygın

Turkish-language surnames